Fox Run is a neighborhood of York in York County, Pennsylvania, United States. Fox Run includes both houses and apartment complexes and it is adjacent to the neighborhood of McDonald Heights.

References

Populated places in York County, Pennsylvania